Pristimera is a genus of flowering plants belonging to the family Celastraceae.

Its native range is Tropics and Subtropics.

Species:

Pristimera andongensis 
Pristimera arnottiana 
Pristimera atractaspis 
Pristimera austin-smithii 
Pristimera biholongii 
Pristimera bojeri 
Pristimera breteleri 
Pristimera brianii 
Pristimera caudata 
Pristimera celastroides 
Pristimera coriacea 
Pristimera dariensis 
Pristimera delagoensis 
Pristimera dewildemaniana 
Pristimera fimbriata 
Pristimera glaga 
Pristimera goetzei 
Pristimera holdeniana 
Pristimera klaineana 
Pristimera longipetiolata 
Pristimera luteoviridis 
Pristimera malifolia 
Pristimera mouilensis 
Pristimera nervosa 
Pristimera paniculata 
Pristimera peglerae 
Pristimera plumbea 
Pristimera polyantha 
Pristimera scheffleri 
Pristimera sclerophylla 
Pristimera staudtii 
Pristimera tenuiflora 
Pristimera tetramera 
Pristimera tisserantii 
Pristimera tulasnei 
Pristimera unguiculata 
Pristimera verrucosa

References

Celastraceae
Celastrales genera